Euploea eleusina, or Vollenhov's crow, is a butterfly in the family Nymphalidae. It was described by Pieter Cramer in 1777. It is found in the Indomalayan realm crossing the Wallace line to Sulawesi in the Australasian realm.

Subspecies
E. e. eleusina (Java, Bali, Kangean)
E. e. mniszechii C. & R. Felder, 1859 (South Sulawesi)
E. e. vollenhovii  C. & R. Felder, [1865] (Sulawesi)
E. e. aganor Fruhstorfer, 1910 (Banggai Island)
E. e. hygina Fruhstorfer, 1910 (Lombok, Sumbawa, Flores, Sumba, Alor)
E. e. anitra Fruhstorfer, 1910 (Central Sulawesi)
E. e. palata Fruhstorfer, 1910 (Central Sulawesi)

Biology
The larva feeds on Streblus asper.

References

External links
Euploea at Markku Savela's Lepidoptera and Some Other Life Forms

Euploea
Butterflies described in 1777